Sumanta Gupta (born 9 February 1991) is an Indian cricketer. He made his List A debut for Bengal in the 2017–18 Vijay Hazare Trophy on 7 February 2018.

References

External links
 

1991 births
Living people
Indian cricketers
Place of birth missing (living people)
Bengal cricketers